Encode or encoding may refer to:

 APL (programming language) dyadic Encode function and its symbol ⊤
 Binary encoding
 Binary-to-text encoding
 Character encoding
 Coding region of a gene
 Encoding, or code
 Encoding (memory)
 Encoding (semiotics)
 ENCODE (Encyclopedia of DNA Elements)
 MPEG encoding
 Semantics encoding
 Text encoding — see character encoding applied to textual data
 Video encoding

See also
 Encoder (disambiguation)
 ENCOD, the European Coalition for Just and Effective Drug Policies